Derek Bailey may refer to:

 Derek Bailey (guitarist) (1930–2005), English avant-garde guitarist
 Derek Bailey (tribal chairman) (1972–2021), Native American tribal chairman and US Congressional candidate

See also
Derrick Bailey (1918–2009), Second World War pilot, cricketer and businessman
Derrick Sherwin Bailey (1910–1984), English theologian